This is a list of significant characters who have appeared on the soap opera Passions.

A
Dr Ackland
Michael Woods (December 22 to 26, 2003), 
Roark Critchlow (December 26, 2003 to March 17, 2004)

Stuart Allen 
Emanuelle Xuereb (2006)

Tina Alverez 
Marita DeLeon (May 2000)

Antoine 
Jean-Michel Richaud (April 19, 2000 to June 13, 2000)

B
Norma Bates 
Marianne Muellerleile (2001–2008)

Grace Bennett
 Dana Sparks (1999–2008)

Hank Bennett
Dalton James (1999–2001) 
Ryan McPartlin (2001–2004)

Jessica Bennett 
Mary Elizabeth Winstead (1999–2000)
Jade Harlow (2000–2003) 
Michelle Holgate (2002; temporary replacement) 
Danica Stewart (2003–2008)

Kay Bennett 
Taylor Anne Mountz (1999–2000)
Gina Marie May (2000; temporary replacement) 
Deanna Wright (2000–2003)
Heidi Mueller (2003–2008)

Noah Bennett 
Dylan Fergus (2005–2008)

Sam Bennett 
James Hyde (1999–2008)

Samuel Bennett 
Unnamed baby (2008)

Doctor Bombay
Bernard Fox (1999–2000)

Nick Bozman 
Michael Bergin (2002)

C
Pierre Carbonneau 
Alain Benatar (1999—2000)

Cecil 
Arturo Gil (2002)

Mort Chandler
Martin Grey (2001–2002)

Viki Chatsworth 
The murderous niece of Esme Vanderheusen; Viki is believed to be mute, though this is later proven to not be the case; murdered multiple boyfriends of her aunt, including Fox Crane; attempted to kill Alistair Crane and later succeeded by shooting him in the chest, confessed to killing both her parents, teamed up with Vincent Clarkson and murdered nearly everyone on the canvas via poisoned mushroom sauce; arrested by Sam Bennett. 
Amy Castle (2007—2008)

Maya Chinn (deceased) 
Kyrie Maezumi (2006)

Vincent Clarkson 
Phillip Jeanmarie (2006—2008)

JT Cornell (deceased) 
Michael Sabatino (2006)

Alistair Crane (deceased) 
The evil megalomaniacal patriarch of the Crane family. Father of Julian and Sheridan Crane. Had an ongoing feud with the Lopez-Fitzgerald family for years and to a lesser extent with the Bennetts; has raped multiple women, faked the death of his infant grandson Vincent because he was black and later twisting his fragile psyche; manipulated his mentally-ill granddaughter Pretty, attempted to kill his daughter Sheridan on multiple occasions and tried to take her son away; held grandson Fox along with Katherine and Gwen captive, murdered his own son Chad; died after being shot in the chest by Viki Chatsworth. 
Alan Oppenheimer (1999–2004; voice)
Bill Dempsey (1999–2004; body double) 
Jordan Baker (2003; as Charlie)
David Bailey (2004–2005)
John Reilly (2005–2008) 

Cracked Connie 
Kacie Borrowman (2002)
Ethan Crane 
Son of Ethan Winthrop and Theresa Lopez-Fitzgerald, legal son of Julian Crane; nicknamed "Little Ethan". 
Thomas and Sarah Buhl (2002)
Colby and Grayson Button (2002–2003)
Nicholas Graziano (2003–2004)
Colton Shires (2004–2008)
Field Cate (2004; temporary replacement)

Fancy Crane Lopez-Fitzgerald 
Emily Harper (2005–2008) 
Krissy Carlson (2008; temporary replacement)

Fox Crane (deceased)
Justin Hartley (2002–2006)
Mark Wystrach (2006–2007)
Nick Stabile (2004; temporary replacement) 

Julian Crane 
Ben Masters (1999–2008)

Pretty Crane 
Melinda Sward (2007–2008)

Sheridan Crane Lopez-Fitzgerald 
McKenzie Westmore (1999–2008) 
Shannon Sturges (2005; temporary replacement)
Kam Heskin (2006, 2008 temporary replacement)

Katherine Barrett Crane
Leigh Taylor-Young (2004–2006)

D
Valerie Davis 
Daphnee Duplaix Samuel (2004–2008)
Siena Goines (2007; temporary replacement)

Demon Elf 
Danny Woodburn (2007-2008)

Doc
Victor McCay (2001–2002)

Dort
Louise Sorel (2004)

Reese Durkee 
Bruce Michael Hall (1999–2003) 
Seth Hall (2003–2004)

E
Elena 
Vivian Gray (2008)

Esmeralda
Georgia Engel (2007) 
Melissa Fahn (2007; flashbacks)

Judge Mablean Ephriam Herself, in a fantasy sequence where the character, T.C. Russell, takes his fictional wife, Eve, onto the Divorce Court television program. (2003)

F
Nanny Phoebe Figalilly (Melissa Caulfield), a role originally played by Mills in the short-lived sitcom Nanny and the Professor (1999, 2005)

Antonio Lopez-Fitzgerald
Eldest son of Martin Fitzgerald and Pilar Lopez-Fitzgerald
 Christopher Douglas (1999-2006)

Luis Lopez-Fitzgerald
Galen Gering (1999-2008)

Faux-Martin Fitzgerald (deceased) 
William Bumiller (1999–2000)

Martin Fitzgerald 
William Bumiller (1999–2000; flashbacks)
Richard Steinmetz (2004–2006)

Miguel Lopez-Fitzgerald
Jesse Metcalfe (1999-2004)
Adrian Bellani (2006-2007)
Blair Redford (2007-2008)

Paloma Lopez-Fitzgerald Bennett 
Silvana Arias (2004-2007)
Hannia Guillen (2007-2008)

Pilar Lopez-Fitzgerald
Eva Tamargo (1999-2008)

Theresa Lopez-Fitzgerald
Lindsay Hartley (1999-2008)
Priscilla Garita (2004; temporary replacement) 

Fluffy 
1999–2008

G
Dr. Gasparro (Michael Gregory, Jan 2007)

H
Palmer Harper (Harrison Young, 2001)

Crystal Harris (deceased) (Brenda Epperson Doumani, 2000)

LaToya Harris (Jennia Fredrique, 2003)

Chad Harris-Crane (deceased)(Donn Swaby, 1999–2002; Charles Divins, 2002–2007)

Miles Harris-Crane (Julard Roddy, 2005; Lauren Beiber, 2005–2007)

David Hastings (Justin Carroll, 2001–2004; Julian Stone, 2003, temporary replacement)

John Hastings (Jack Krizmanich, 2001–2004)

Hecuba (Robin Strasser, 2000–2001, 2002)

Henchman (Hector Luis Bustamante, 2008)

Robert Horry (himself, 1999)

Rebecca Hotchkiss  (Maureen McCormick, 2000) (Andrea Evans, 2000–2008)

I
Aunt Irma (Marla Gibbs, 2004–05)

J
Irma Johnson (Marla Gibbs, 2004, 2005)

K
Nurse Kravitz (Ruth Buzzi, 2003)

L
Lena (deceased)(Meredyth Hunt, 2006)

Endora Lenox (Nicole Cox, 2003–2008)

Tabitha Lenox (Juliet Mills, 1999–2008; Jane Carr, 2006, temporary replacement, Kim Huber, 2007 flashbacks only)

Timmy Lenox (deceased) (Josh Ryan Evans, 1999–2002)

Little Angel Girl (Chea Courtney, 1999–2002; Diandra Newlin, 2003)

Frank Lomax (Jason Olive, 1999)

Father Lonigan (Bruce French, 1999–2008)

Cristina Lopez (Cristina Saralegui, 2001)

Francisco Lopez (Emiliano Diez, 2001)

Maria Lopez (deceased)(Marta DuBois, 2004, 2007)

Antonio Lopez-Fitzgerald (Christopher Douglas, 2001–2004, 2008)

Luis Lopez-Fitzgerald (Galen Gering, 1999–2008)

Father Lonigan 
Played By Bruce French, (1999-2008)

Maria Lopez-Fitzgerald (Sloane Kiley, 2003–2005; Lauren and Hannah Maddox, 2005; Mercedez and Isabella Soto, 2005–2006; Layla and Logan Wheeler, 2006–2007; Emma and Abby McCoy, 2007–2008; Stephanie Cantu, 2007, as a teenager)

Marty Lopez-Fitzgerald 
Son of Luis Lopez-Fitzgerald and Sheridan Crane Lopez-Fitzgerald :(Derek Jones, 2003; Lillith Street and Timothy Jeffs, 2003–2004; Jack and James Wright, 2004–2005; Griffin and Sawyer Miller, 2004; Mitchell and Shane Albin, 2005–2006; Daniel Chalfa, 2007–2008)

Miguel Lopez-Fitzgerald (Jesse Metcalfe, 1999–2004; Jaylen Moore, 2005 temporary replacement; Adrian Bellani, 2006–2007; Blair Redford, 2007–2008)

Paloma Bennett (Silvana Arias, 2004–2007; Hannia Guillen, 2007–2008)

Pilar Lopez-Fitzgerald (Eva Tamargo, 1999–2008)

Theresa Lopez-Fitzgerald Winthrop (Lindsay Hartley, 1999–2008; Priscilla Garita, 2004, temporary replacement)

Spike Lester
 Played By Christopher Maleki, (2005-2008)

M
Matilda Matthews (deceased)
(Alice Ghostley, 2000)

Mimi (deceased)(Eva Frajinko, 1999)

Mother Superior(Julia Duffy, 2005–06)

Jean-Luc Moulin (deceased)(Eric Bizot, 1999)

Mýa (herself, 2003)

N
Grace Nancier (Tonja Walker, 2005–2007)

P
Orville Perkins (deceased) (Owen Bush, 1999–2000)

Young Pillar (Gabby Tamargo, 2008)

Phyllis (deceased)(Cynthia Mann Jamin, 2002, Renee Raudman, 2002–2006)

Precious (BamBam and Tango, 2003–2005)

Maureen Preston (deceased) (Cynthia Holloway, 2005)

R
Judge JE Reilly (Bruce Grey, 2001–2007)

Roger (Francois Guetary, 1999–2000)

Roberto (Jorge Alberti, 2004–2006; Jean Paul San Pedro, 2008)

Eve Russell (Tracey Ross, 1999–2008)

Simone Russell (Lena Cardwell, 1999–2001; Chrystee Pharris-Larkins, 2001–2004; Cathy Jenéen Doe, 2004–2007)

TC Russell (Rodney Van Johnson, 1999–2007)

Whitney Russell Harris-Crane (Brook Kerr, 1999–2007)

S
Liz Sanbourne (Amelia Marshall, 2001–06)

Scissor Sisters (themselves, 2007)

Natasha Simms (LeAnna Campbell, 2002–2006; Katy Durham, 2004, temporary replacement; Cristi Harris, 2005, temporary replacement)

Siren (Brandi Burkhardt, 2006)

Charity Standish (Molly Stanton, 1999–2004; Kristina Sisco, 2006–2007)

Faith Standish (deceased) (Dana Sparks, 1999)

Prudence Standish (deceased) (Molly Stanton, 1999–2001, Heidi Mueller, 2007–2008)

Nurse Stevens (Anne Wyndham, 2007)

Woody Stumper (Robert Gossett, 2002–2004)

Suzanne (Dana Waters, 1999–2000)

T
Rae Thomas (deceased) (Jossara Jinaro, 2005–2007)

Toto (2002)

V
 Syd Valentine (Alisa Reyes, 2003)

 Esme Vanderheusen (Erin Cardillo, 2005–2008)

Edna Wallace (Kathleen Noone, 2002–2008)

Chuck Wilson (Christopher DeLisle, 2000)

Dr. Tonia Wilson (Tonia Kalouria, 2002–2007)

Ethan Winthrop (Travis Schuldt, 1999–2002; Eric Martsolf, 2002–2008; Rib Hillis, 2006, temporary replacement)

Jane Winthrop (Caleb and Jonah Gilpin, 2005; Kacey Malmsten, 2006–2008)

Jonathan Winthrop (Jack and Nathan Ecker, 2007–2008)

W
Gwen Hotchkiss Winthrop
Played By Liza Huber (1999–2008)
Played By Natalie Zea (2000–2002)

Ethan Winthrop
Played By Travis Schuldt (1999–2002)
Played By Eric Martsolf (2002–2008)

Ivy Winthrop
Played By Kim Johnston Ulrich (1999–2008)

Beth Wallace
Played By Kelli McCarty (1999–2006)

Notes and references

External links
NBC.com
PS Online | Who's Who
PS Online | Family Trees

 
Passions characters
Passions